Hoabinhian is a lithic techno-complex of archaeological sites associated with assemblages in Southeast Asia from late Pleistocene to Holocene, dated to c.10,000–2000 BCE. It is attributed to hunter-gatherer societies of the region and their technological variability over time is poorly understood. In 2016 a rockshelter was identified in Yunnan (China), where artifacts belonging to the Hoabinhian technocomplex were recognized. These artifacts date from 41,500 BCE.

Bacsonian is often regarded as a variation of the Hoabinhian industry characterized by a higher frequency of edge-grounded cobble artifacts compared to earlier Hoabinhian artifacts, dated to c. 8000–4000 BCE.

Definition
The term Hòa Bình culture (in French culture de Hoà Bình) was first used by French archaeologists working in Northern Vietnam to describe Holocene period archaeological assemblages excavated from rock shelters. The related English adjective Hoabinhian (French hoabianien) became a common term in the English-based literature to describe stone artifact assemblages in Mainland Southeast Asia that contain flaked, cobble artifacts. The term was originally used to refer to a specific ethnic group, restricted to a limited period with a distinctive subsistence economy and technology. More recent work (e.g., Shoocongdej 2000) uses the term to refer to artifacts and assemblages with certain formal characteristics.

History
In 1927, Madeleine Colani published some details of her nine excavations in the northern Vietnamese province of Hòa Bình. As a result of her work the First Congress of Prehistorians of the Far East in 1932 agreed to define the Hoabinhian as:

a culture composed of implements that are in general flaked with somewhat varied types of primitive workmanship. It is characterised by tools often worked only on one face, by hammerstones, by implements of sub-triangular section, by discs, short axes and almond shaped artefacts, with an appreciable number of bone tools (Matthews 1966).

Despite the general terms of the definition, Colani's Hoabinhian is an elaborate typology as indicated by the 82 artefacts from Sao Dong that Colani classified into 28 types (Matthews 1966). The original typology is so complicated that most Hoabinhian sites are identified simply by the presence of sumatraliths (White & Gorman 1979). The chronology of Hoabinhian artifacts was assumed to be Holocene because of the extant fauna found in the assemblages and the absence of extinct fauna by Colani and others working before the availability of radiocarbon dating methods in the 1950s.

Problems with Colani's typology were exposed by Matthews (1964) who analysed metric and technological attributes of unifacially flaked cobble artifacts from Hoabinhian levels at Sai Yok Rockshelter, Kanchanaburi Province, west-central Thailand. His aim was to determine if Hoabinhian artefact types described by Colani could be defined as clusters of constantly recurring attributes such as length, width, thickness, mass, length-width ratio and cortex amount and distribution. Matthews found that Hoabinhian types did not exist and instead Hoabinhian artifacts reflect a continuous range of shapes and sizes.

Following his archaeological excavation and surveys in Mae Hong Son Province, northwest Thailand, Chester Gorman (1970) proposed a more detailed definition as follows

 A generally unifacial flaked tool tradition made primarily on water rounded pebbles and large flakes detached from these pebbles
 Core tools ("Sumatraliths") made by complete flaking on one side of a pebble and grinding stones also made on rounded pebbles, usually in association with iron oxide
 A high incidence of used flakes (identified from edge-damage characteristics)
 Fairly similar assemblages of food remains including remains of extant shellfish, fish and small-to-medium-size mammals
 A cultural and ecological orientation to the use of rockshelters generally occurring near freshwater streams in an upland karstic topography (though Hoabinhian shell middens do indicate at least one other ecological orientation)
 Edge-grinding and cord-marked ceramics occurring, individually or together, in the upper layers of Hoabinhian deposits

Gorman's work included a number of radiocarbon dates that confirmed the Holocene age of the Hoabinhian. Gorman's carbon-14 dates place Hoabinhian levels at spirit cave between 12,000 and 8000 BP, these levels have also produced cord-marked ceramics. The term was redefined in 1994 by archaeologists attending a conference held in Hanoi. At this conference Vietnamese archaeologists presented evidence of Hoabinhian artifacts dating to 17,000 years before the present. A vote was held where it was agreed that

 The concept of the Hoabinhian should be kept
 The best concept for "Hoabinhian" was an industry rather than a culture or techno-complex
 The chronology of the Hoabinhian industry dates is from "late-to-terminal Pleistocene to early-to-mid Holocene"
 The term "Sumatralith" should be retained
 The Hoabinhian Industry should be referred to as a "cobble" rather that a "pebble" tool industry
 The Hoabinhian should not be referred to as a "Mesolithic" phenomenon

Pre-Hoabinian technology 
Hà Văn Tấn outlined in his paper his definition of a lithic technology that occurred before the Hoabinian. He found primitive flakes in stratigraphy below Hoabinian pebble tools across several sites in Southeast Asia which led him to name the flake technology, Nguomian — named after a large assembly of flakes found at the Ngườm rock shelter in Thái Nguyên province, Vietnam. Hoabininhian technology is also claimed to be a continuation of the Sonvian technology.

Geographical distribution 
Since the term was first used to describe assemblages from sites in Vietnam, many sites throughout mainland and island Southeast Asia have been described as having Hoabinhian components. The apparent concentration of more than 120 Hoabinhian sites in Vietnam reflects intensive research activities in this area rather the location of a centre of the prehistoric Hoabinhian activity.

The oldest Hoabinhian complex was discovered at Xiaodong, a large rockshelter in Yunnan, China,  from the Burmese border. It is the only Hoabinhian site discovered in China.

Archaeological sites in Terengganu, Sumatra, Thailand, Laos, Myanmar and Cambodia have been identified as Hoabinhian, although the quality and quantity of descriptions vary and the relative significance of the Hoabinhian component at these sites can be difficult to determine.

Recent archaeological research indicates that variation in Hoabinhian artifacts across regions are largely influenced by local, region-specific proximity to resources and changes in environmental conditions.

Beyond this core area, some archaeologists argue that there are isolated inventories of stone artifacts displaying Hoabinhian elements in Nepal, South China, Taiwan and Australia  (Moser 2001).

The Hoabinhian and plant domestication 
Gorman (1971) claimed that Spirit Cave included remains of Prunus (almond), Terminalia, Areca (betel), Vicia (broadbean) or Phaseolus, Pisum (pea) or Raphia lagenaria (bottle gourd), Trapa (water caltrop), Piper (pepper), Madhuca (butternut), Canarium, Aleurites (candle nut), and Cucumis (a cucumber type) in layers dating to c. 9800-8500 BP. None of the recovered specimens differed from their wild phenotypes. He suggested that these may have been used as foods, condiments, stimulants, for lighting and that the leguminous plants in particular 'point to a very early use of domesticated plants' (Gorman 1969:672). He later wrote (1971:311) that 'Whether they are definitely early cultigens (see Yen n.d.:12) remains to be established... What is important, and what we can say definitely, is that the remains indicate the early, quite sophisticated use of particular species which are still culturally important in Southeast Asia.'

In 1972, W. G. Solheim, as the director of the project of which Spirit Cave was part, published an article in Scientific American discussing the finds from Spirit Cave. While Solheim noted that the specimens may 'merely be wild species gathered from the surrounding countryside', he claimed that the inhabitants at Spirit Cave had 'an advanced knowledge of horticulture'. Solheim's chronological chart suggests that 'incipient agriculture' began at about 20,000 BC in southeast Asia. He also suggests that ceramic technology was invented at 13,000 BC although Spirit Cave does not have ceramics until after 6800 BC.

Although Solheim concludes that his reconstruction is 'largely hypothetical', his overstatement of the results of Gorman's excavation has led to inflated claims of Hoabinhian agriculture. These claims have detracted from the significance of Spirit Cave as a site with well-preserved evidence of human subsistence and palaeoenvironmental conditions during the Hoabinhian.

Viet (2004), however, focuses on mainly Hoabinhians in Viet Nam. Within his wide range of study of this area, Da But is a site that he has worked at which is dated to about fifth to sixth millennium BC to the end of the third millennium BC. Within this site, Viet observed that the food Hoabinhians mostly focused on are mountainous shellfish, nuts, and fruit. Interesting enough, the site even shows a new shellfish species that they consumed: an as-yet-unnamed species of freshwater clam of Corbicula spp; species are known to live in swampy areas and lakes.

The general food sources of Hoabinhians were gathered from the follow environmental conditions:
 Limestone rock mountains (delivering land snails and some small mammals)
 Mountain water sources like streams, small rivers, swamps and lakes (providing snails and fish)
 Valley earthen surfaces (nuts, fruits, fungi, vegetables, wild cereals, and wild mammals)

Hoabinhian stone artefact technology 
An experimental Hoabinhian assemblage was created and analyzed by Marwick (2008), which identified variables and methods that are the most useful in analyzing Hoabinhian assemblages. In particular he advocated for the use of a new method involving the dorsal cortex location of a flake. This method in particular was found to be especially useful in determining reduction intensity and may prove instrumental in answering broader archaeological questions involving subsistence, geographic range, and domestication. Based on Marwick's own research and Shoocongdej's (2000, 2006), behavioral ecological models were applied to examine human behavior through lithic assemblages which found in Tham Lod and Ban Rai rockshelters. In theory, high frequencies of pre-processing should reflect logistical mobility strategy. However, at Tham Lod, a high frequencies of pre-processing (CPM) but a residential mobility strategy (ODM) and a low intensity of occupation (PCM) was observed: We can see an internal conflict between models. A multiple optima model is proposed to explain this contradictory result. Multiple optima model allows more than one optimal scenario and is valid to explain high time-devoting lithic technology (i.e., pre-processing of lithic) and more residential mobility strategy in the same time.

Genetic links to ancient and modern East and Southeast Asian populations
, only two ancient DNA samples have been extracted from individuals excavated in Hoabinhian contexts: one specimen from in Pha Faen in Bolikhamxay Province, Laos (7888 ± 40 BP) and one from Gua Cha in Ulu Kelantan, Malaysia (4319 ± 64 BP). While the Upper Paleolithic origins of this 'Hoabinhian ancestry' represented by the two samples are unknown, Hoabinhian ancestry has been found to be related to the main 'East Asian' ancestry component found in most modern East and Southeast Asians, although deeply diverged from it. Among present-day populations, the Andamanese Onge and Jarawa, and the Semang (also known as "Malaysian Negritos") and Maniq in the interior of the Malay Peninsula are genetically closest to the sampled ancient Hoabinhian individuals.

The emergence of the Neolithic in Southeast Asia went along with a population shift caused by migrations from southern China. Neolithic Mainland Southeast Asian samples predominantly have East Asian ancestry related to ancient populations from southern China, but many of these samples also display admixture with Hoabinhian ancestry or Hoabinhian-related ancestry to a smaller degree. In modern populations, this admixture of East Asian and Hoabinhian (or Hoabinhian-related) ancestry is most strongly associated with Austroasiatic-speaking groups, and can also be reproduced in models where Onge samples are taken as proxies for Hoabinhian ancestry.

See also
Con Moong Cave
An Son

References

Sources

Literature
Colani M. (1927) L'âge de la pierre dans la province de Hoa Binh. Mémoires du Service Géologique de l'Indochine 13
Flannery, KV. (1973) The origins of agriculture. Annual Review of Anthropology 2: 271-310
Forestier H, Zeitoun V, Winayalai C and Métais C (2013). The open-air site of Huai Hin (Northwestern Thailand): Chronological perspectives for the Hoabinhian. Comptes Rendus Palevol 12(1)
Gorman C. (1969) Hoabinhian: A pebble tool complex with early plant associations in Southeast Asia. Science 163: 671-3
Gorman C. (1970) Excavations at Spirit Cave, North Thailand: Some interim interpretations. Asian Perspectives 13: 79-107
Gorman C. (1971) The Hoabinhian and After: Subsistence Patterns in Southeast Asia during the Late Pleistocene and Early Recent Periods. World Archaeology 2: 300-20
Matthews JM. (1964) The Hoabinhian in Southeast Asia and elsewhere. PhD thesis. Australian National University, Canberra
Matthews JM. (1966) A Review of the 'Hoabinhian' in Indo-China. Asian Perspectives 9: 86-95
Marwick, B. (2008) What attributes are important for the measurement of assemblage reduction intensity? Results from an experimental stone artefact assemblage with relevance to the Hoabinhian of mainland Southeast Asia. Journal of Archaeological Science 35(5): 1189-1200
 Marwick, B. and M. K. Gagan (2011) Late Pleistocene monsoon variability in northwest Thailand: an oxygen isotope sequence from the bivalve Margaritanopsis laosensis excavated in Mae Hong Son province. Quaternary Science Reviews 30(21-22): 3088-3098
Moser, J. (2001) Hoabinhian: Geographie und Chronologie eines steinzeitlichen Technocomplexes in Südostasien Köln, Lindensoft.
Pookajorn S. (1988) Archaeological research of the Hoabinhian culture or technocomplex and its comparison with ethnoarchaeology of the Phi Tong Luang, a hunter-gatherer group of Thailand. Tübingen: Verlag Archaeologica Venatoria: Institut fur Urgeschichte der Universitat Tübingen.
Shoocongdej R. (2000) Forager Mobility Organization in Seasonal Tropical Environments of Western Thailand. World Archaeology 32: 14–40.
Solheim, W.G. (1972) An earlier agricultural revolution. Scientific American 226: 34-41
Van Tan H. (1994) The Hoabinhian in Southeast Asia: Culture, cultures or technocomplex? Vietnam Social Sciences 5: 3-8
Van Tan H. (1997) The Hoabinhian and before. Bulletin of the Indo-Pacific Prehistory Association (Chiang Mai Papers, Volume 3) 16: 35-41
White JC, Gorman C. (2004) Patterns in "amorphous" industries: The Hoabinhian viewed through a lithic reduction sequence. IN Paz, V. (ed) Southeast Asian archaeology: Wilhelm G. Solheim II Festschrift University of the Philippines Press, Quezon City. pp. 411–441.
White JC, Penny D, Kealhofer L and Maloney B 2004. Vegetation changes from the late Pleistocene through the Holocene from three areas of archaeological significance in Thailand. Quaternary International 113(1)
Zeitoun, V., Forestier, H., Pierret, A., Chiemsisouraj, C., Lorvankham, M., Latthagnot, A., ... & Norkhamsomphou, S. (2012). Multi-millennial occupation in northwestern Laos: Preliminary results of excavations at the Ngeubhinh Mouxeu rock-shelter. Comptes Rendus Palevol, 11(4), 305–313.

Ancient Vietnam
Prehistoric Thailand
Archaeological cultures of Southeast Asia
Archaeological cultures in Vietnam
Mesolithic cultures of Asia
Archaeological cultures in Cambodia